The City of Castlemaine was a local government area about  north-northwest of Melbourne, the state capital of Victoria, Australia, and  south of the regional city of Bendigo.

History

Castlemaine was first incorporated as a municipal district on 23 April 1855. It became a borough on 1 October 1863, a town on 30 January 1950, and was proclaimed a city on 4 December 1965.

On 20 January 1995, the City of Castlemaine was abolished, and along with the Shires of Maldon, Metcalfe and Newstead, was merged into the newly created Shire of Mount Alexander.

Wards
The City of Castlemaine was not divided into wards, and its nine councillors represented the entire city.

Population

* Estimate in the 1958 Victorian Year Book.

References

External links
 Victorian Places - Castlemaine

Castlemaine